Unbreakable is a Nigerian Romantic film about a husband who had to deal with the mental issue of his newly married wife. It was produced by Buky Campbell, directed by Ben Chiadika and written by Sola Osofisan. It was shot in October 2018 in Lagos.

Cast 

O.C. Ukeje as Chidi

Arese Emokpae as Ikepo

Yinka Davies as Receptionist

John Dumelo as Mike

Wendy Lawal as Kunle

Uche Mac-Auley as Dr Tebowei

Bimbo Manuel as Damola

Richard Mofe-Damijo as General

Plot 
The wedding was heavenly, Honeymoon paradise. Chidi and Ikepo appeared set for the good long life....On the first day at work after his honeymoon, Chidi in good spirits is shown a video of his new wife, Ikepo, the woman he just left at home, walking the streets seemingly out of her mind.

References 

2019 films
Nigerian romantic drama films